This is a list of rulers of Saudi Arabia, a kingdom on the Arabian Peninsula.

House of Saud founder (1720−1726)

Emirate of Diriyah (1727-1818)

Emirate of Nejd (1823-1891)

Kingdom of Saudi Arabia (1932–present)

Timeline

Standard of the Kingdom

The Royal Standard consists of a green flag, with an Arabic inscription and a sword featured in white, and with the national emblem embroidered in gold in the lower right canton of the year 1973.

The script on the flag is written in the Thuluth script. It is the shahada or Islamic declaration of faith:

 
 
There is no other god but God, Muhammad is the messenger of God.

See also
History of Saudi Arabia

References

 assassinated.

History of Saudi Arabia
Saudi
Rulers
 
 
Rulers